Nikolay Vladimirovich Pavlov (born May 22, 1982) is a Russian and prior 2007 Ukrainian volleyball player who plays for the Russia men's national volleyball team and the Russian club Gubernija. Pavlov and his team won the 2013 World League and the 2013 European Championship. He was named MVP at the 2013 World League.

Sporting achievements

CEV Cup
  2011/2012, with Dinamo Moscow

Individual awards
 2014 Russian Volleyball Super League - Most Valuable Player
 2013 Memorial of Hubert Jerzy Wagner - Best Scorer
 2013 Memorial of Hubert Jerzy Wagner - Most Valuable Player
 2013 World League - Most Valuable Player
 2012 CEV Cup - Most Valuable Player
 2010 Cup of Russia - Most Valuable Player
 2010 Cup of Russia - Best Scorer

External links
 Player profile in 2014 World Championship
 2011 World League player profile
 Pavlov MVP in World League 2013
 BigBet Player profile - About

1982 births
Living people
Sportspeople from Poltava
Ukrainian people of Russian descent
Ukrainian men's volleyball players
Naturalised citizens of Russia
Russian men's volleyball players
VC Yurydychna Akademiya Kharkiv players